European route E 264 is a Class B road part of the International E-road network. It begins in Jõhvi, Estonia and ends in Inčukalns, Latvia. E264 consists of Estonian main road no. 3 and Latvian main road A3. The entire route is part of Via Hanseatica corridor.

The road follows: Jõhvi – Tartu – Valga – Valka – Valmiera – Inčukalns.

Gallery

External links 
 UN Economic Commission for Europe: Overall Map of E-road Network (2007)

264
E264
E264